Ballomma is a genus of spiders in the family Zodariidae. It was first described in 2015 by Jocqué & Henrard. , it contains 4 species from South Africa.

References

Zodariidae
Araneomorphae genera
Spiders of South Africa